Thenkurissi may refer to

Thenkurissi-I, a village in Palakkad district, Kerala, India
Thenkurissi-II, a village in Palakkad district, Kerala, India
Thenkurissi (gram panchayat), a gram panchayat serving the above villages